The Jet Age Museum is the trading name of the Gloucestershire Aviation Collection, an all-volunteer, charitable organisation dedicated to the preservation of Gloucestershire's aviation heritage. The aviation museum is located on the north side of Gloucestershire Airport, between Gloucester and Cheltenham. It houses a number of aircraft, aero engines, cockpits and other related exhibits. It is themed on the early development of jet aircraft, in particular the role played by the Gloster Aircraft Company and other local firms such as Dowty Rotol and Smiths Industries.  The museum is also the custodian of the Russell Adams photographic archive.

History
The organisation was formed in 1986 and established as a company limited by guarantee.

The museum first opened to the public at the Gloucester Trading Estate, the former Brockworth aerodrome. With the aid of grants and public donations, it began to amass a collection of aircraft. The museum's first significant public opening began with a temporary exhibition in a hangar adjacent to Gloucestershire Airport. This had to close in 2000 after it was announced the former wartime hangar was to be demolished. The aircraft were dispersed to a number of locations in Gloucestershire including, briefly, at the former GAC 'shadow' factory at Bentham. A workshop was established at Brockworth Court and the remaining airframes eventually made their way back to Gloucestershire Airport, where they were placed in open storage. In 2005, an Avro Anson in the collection was sold for restoration.

The museum made a number of unsuccessful bids to the Heritage Lottery Fund to construct a purpose-built facility before finally submitting plans for a building at Gloucestershire Airport.  In January 2011 plans were approved for a new to house the museum's collection. One year later, an agreement was reached for a 45 year lease of the land the building sits on.

The museum opened provisionally from 24 August 2013 and officially in May 2014. A Gloster Meteor was added in 2013 and a Gloster Javelin purchased from RAF Leeming in 2014 was moved to the museum a few months later. With these acquisitions, the museum had a significant number of aircraft on display outside and as a result announced a fundraising campaign for an extension in 2019.

Collection

Aircraft on display

 Gloster Gamecock J7904 – reproduction
 Gloster E28/39 – replica
 Gloster Meteor F.8 WH364
 Gloster Meteor NF.13 WM366 – on loan
 Gloster Meteor T.7 VW453
 Gloster Meteor T.7 WF784
 Gloster Javelin FAW.9 XH903
 Hawker Hurricane V6799 – replica

Aircraft cockpits

 Avro Vulcan B.2 XM569
 Gloster Meteor F.3 EE425
 Hawker Hunter F.4 XE664
 Hawker Siddeley Harrier T.2 XW264
 Hawker Siddeley Trident 3B 2321

Aircraft stored or under restoration

 Airspeed Horsa – replica cockpit 
 Armstrong-Whitworth Meteor NF.14 WS807
 English Electric Canberra B.2 WK126 – on loan
 Gloster Gladiator II N5914
 Gloster Javelin FAW.4 XA634
 Hawker Typhoon Ia/Ib

See also
List of aerospace museums

References

External links

Official website

Aerospace museums in England
Museums in Gloucestershire